Olgiate may refer to:

 Olgiate Comasco, municipality in the Province of Como in the Italian region Lombardy, Italy
 Olgiate Molgora, municipality in the Province of Lecco in the Italian region Lombardy, Italy
 Olgiate Olona, town and comune in the province of Varese, in the Lombardy region of northern Italy.